The Centre for Research in Photonics (CRPuO) is a research facility at the University of Ottawa in Ottawa, Ontario, Canada. The center was created in 2002 to study photonics. Photonics embraces the science of light, its interaction with matter, and the technology for its generation, manipulation, transmission and detection. Within the CRPuO there are the Solar Cells and Nanostructured Lab (SUNLab) as well as the Photonic Technology Laboratory (PTLab) among others.

 the CRPuO was recruiting three more faculty to support the CERC, and is likely the strongest concentration of photonics professors in Canada. Recognising the strength of Photonics at the University of Ottawa, the university was constructing a C$55M building (the Advanced Research Centre) to house all the photonics professors and their research groups. The construction was due to complete in 2014.

External links
 Centre for Research in Photonics at the University of Ottawa Official site.
 Photonics Network Technology Laboratory (PNTL)
 Trevor J. Hall, Director of the Centre for Research in Photonics at the University of Ottawa 
 Microwave Photonics Research Laboratory (MWPLab) 
 SUNLab
 PTLab
 Ottawa Photonics Cluster

References

 University of Ottawa creates Centre for Research in Photonics. February 5, 2002

University of Ottawa
Photonics
Educational institutions established in 2002
2002 establishments in Ontario